Bengal is a region in South Asia.  

Bengal or Bengals may also refer to:

Places
 Bengal Presidency, a large administrative division of the British Raj, precursor to the next three:
 Bangladesh, a country in modern South Asia
 East Bengal, a historical region, became East Pakistan and then Bangladesh
 West Bengal, a state in the modern-day Republic of India
 Bengal, Indiana, an unincorporated community
 Bengal, Kentucky, an unincorporated community
 Bengal Township, Michigan
 Bengal, Minnesota
 Bengal, Missouri, an unincorporated community

Sports
 Bayou Bengals, a nickname for the LSU Tigers athletic team
 Beckley Bengals, an American baseball team of 1930s
 Buffalo State Bengals, sports teams of Buffalo State College in Buffalo, New York
 Cincinnati Bengals, an American football franchise
 Idaho State Bengals, sports teams of Idaho State University in Pocatello, Idaho
 Trenton Bengals, two separate American basketball teams of 1920s and 1930s
 Khulna Royal Bengals, was a BPL T20 team based on Khulna

Transportation
 Bengal (1799 EIC ship)
 Bengal (1811 EIC ship)
 HMIS Bengal (J243), a 1942 Bathurst class corvette of the Royal Indian Navy
 45577 Bengal, a British LMS Jubilee Class locomotive

Plants and animals
 Bengal cat, a cross breed of domestic cat, Felis catus, with the leopard cat, Prionailurus bengalensis
 Bengal tiger, Panthera tigris tigris, native to the Indian subcontinent
 Bengal rose or Rosa chinensis, a white fragrant rose

Other
 Bengal Foundation,  a Bangladeshi non-profit and charitable organization.
 Bengal (comics), a fictional martial arts expert in Marvel Comics
 BENGAL (project), European 1990s marine research project
 Rose bengal, a stain used in biological analysis

See also 
 Bengel (disambiguation)
 Bangle (disambiguation)
 Bangla (disambiguation)
 Bay of Bengal